You Are My Spring is a 2021 South Korean television series directed by Jung Ji-hyun and starring Seo Hyun-jin, Kim Dong-wook, Yoon Park, and Nam Gyu-ri. The series follows the three main characters who come to deal with their interconnected childhood traumas. It premiered on tvN on July 5, 2021, and aired every Monday and Tuesday at 21:00 (KST) for 16 episodes. It is available worldwide for streaming on Netflix.

Synopsis

The series concerns three characters who are still dealing with interconnected childhood traumas. Kang Da-jeong (Seo Hyun-jin) is a hotel concierge manager with a history of bad relationships, who moves to the rooftop of a new building for a fresh start. Joo Young-do (Kim Dong-wook) is a psychiatrist who does all he can to help people live. Chae Joon (Yoon Park) pursues Da-jeong after he finally found her again. Ahn Ga-yeong (Nam Gyu-ri) is an actress recovering from depression who doesn't know what to do in a new relationship.

Cast

Main 
 Seo Hyun-jin as Kang Da-jeong
 34 years old, A hotel concierge manager, and lives on the rooftop floor of the Gugu building.
 Ok Ye-rin as young Kang Da-jeong
 Kim Dong-wook as Joo Yeong-do
 Choi Yoon-jae as young Joo Yeong-do 
 A psychiatrist who wants to make people live.
 Yoon Park as Chae Joon/Dr. Ian Chase
 Choi Min-young as Young Chae Joon
 The CEO of an investment company, he has a one-sided crush on Kang Da-jeong
 Nam Gyu-ri as Ahn Ga-yeong
 An actress who is afraid to love due to a bad experience.

Supporting

People around Kang Da-jeong 
 Oh Hyun-kyung as Mun Mi-ran
 the mother of Kang Da-jeong, runs a pizza shop.
 Kang Hoon as Kang Tae-jung
 Kang Da-jeong's younger brother, a handsome bartender who attracts female customers with his pleasant shape and a sentimental attitude
 Park Ye-ni as Heo Yoo-kyung 
 Kang Da-jeong's fellow hotelier,  been to a foreign school and speaks fluent English. She is a kind and meticulous professional, and has an honest, playful and friendly personality
 Kim Ye-won as Park Eun-ha 
 Kang Da-jeong's close friend and cafe owner.
 Han Min as Park Chul-do
Kang Da-jeong's close friend and the twin brother of Park Eun-ha.
 Park Jong-wook as Jung-bin
Hotel concierge manager, Kang Da-jeong's assistant
 Jang Seong-hoon as Secretary Chu
 Handsome secretary for hotel VIP guests

People around Joo Yeong-do 
 Baek Hyun-joo as Oh Mi-kyung
 She works as a nurse 
 Lee Hae-young as Go Jin-bok 
 the detective team leader of the 3rd strong team of the Pungji Police Station
 Yoon Ji-on as Park Ho
 The youngest detective in Team 3 at Pungji Police Station.
 Kim Seo-kyung as Cheon Seung-won 
 A self-proclaimed genius entertainment producer, the best friend of Joo Yeong-do
 Ji Seung-hyun as Seo Ha-neul
A veterinarian who runs the animal hospital in Gugu Building, Joo Yeong-do's friend and has a warm and kind appearance

People around Ahn Ga-yeong 
 Park Sang-nam as  Patrick / Ryu Seok-jun
A member of the 3rd biggest boy group in Korea, 'Cayman', and is a Ahn Ga-yeong's fan even before he debuted
 Hwang Seung-eon as Jin-ho 
A former boxer and fitness trainer, in-charge of Ahn Ga-yeong's training. She enjoys making people stronger

Others 
 Yoon Sang-jeong as Min Ah-ri  
A professional part-timer, doing job in a cafe

Special appearance 
 Nam Mi-jung as Shaman (Ep.2)
 Kim Nam-hee as Actor (Ep.9–10) 
 Go Geon-han as Jun-ho, Eun-ha's ex-boyfriend (Ep.9)

Production

Casting
On 14 September 2020, Seo Hyun-jin was confirmed to play the main lead in the drama as Kang Da-jung, a hotel concierge. On 31 December, it was reported that Kim Dong-wook was reviewing the proposal to play as male lead in the drama opposite Seo Hyun-jin. In the second week of January 2021, the main cast of the television series was confirmed as Seo Hyun-jin, Kim Dong-wook, Yoon Park and Nam Gyu-ri.

Filming
Principal photography began in early February 2021, in Suamgol, Cheongju.

Original soundtrack

Part 1

Part 2

Part 3

Part 4

Part 5

Part 6

Part 7

Part 8

Part 9

Release
On May 31, 2021 release date of the series with a teaser was announced. The series premiered on July 5, 2021 on tvN at 21:00 KST, it is available for streaming on Netflix.

Viewership

References

External links
  
 You Are My Spring at Daum 
 You Are My Spring at Naver 
 
 
 

TVN (South Korean TV channel) television dramas
2021 South Korean television series debuts
2021 South Korean television series endings
Television series by Hwa&Dam Pictures
South Korean fantasy television series
Korean-language Netflix exclusive international distribution programming